

St Sepulchre's Cemetery is a cemetery located on Walton Street, Jericho, central Oxford, England.

The cemetery was opened in 1848 as a cemetery for the Oxford parishes of St Giles, St Paul, St Michael, and St Mary Magdalen. It was founded because all the other existing Oxford cemeteries were overcrowded after many hundreds of years of burials; two other cemeteries, Osney Cemetery and Holywell Cemetery, were also opened at the same time, to cater to the other eight Oxford parishes. In 1855, new burials were forbidden in all Oxford churchyards, with burials only to take place in existing vaults. However, this order seems to have been ignored; by 1887 the cemetery was supposedly so full that bones were littered between graves. The last new grave was dug in 1944, as St Sepulchre's finally stopped accepting new burials in 1945. After 1945, the cemetery deteriorated significantly; the gatehouse was sold as a private house and the chapel demolished in 1970. In 2004, St Sepulchre's was added to the Register of Historic Parks and Gardens, and in 2005 the group "Friends of St Sepulchre's" was created to uphold the cemetery.

The cemetery was formerly surrounded on two sides by the Eagle Ironworks, which shut down in 2005 and has since been replaced by apartments. 

The cemetery is listed Grade II on the Register of Historic Parks and Gardens.

Notable internments 
A number of well-known people are buried in the cemetery, including:
 Meta Brevoort, American-British mountain climber.
 Edward Caird, Master of Balliol College, Oxford.
 John Cavell, proprietor of what was once Oxford's leading department store, Elliston & Cavell, and Mayor of Oxford.
 Thomas Combe, an early Superintendent of the Oxford University Press and benefactor of St Barnabas Church, both nearby.
 Robinson Ellis, classical scholar.
 Benjamin Jowett, a Victorian Vice-Chancellor of Oxford University and Master of Balliol College.
 George Uglow Pope, popularly known as Rev. G.U. Pope or just G.U. Pope, a Christian missionary who spent many years in Tamil Nadu and translated many Tamil texts into English.
 Henry John Stephen Smith, (1826–1883) mathematician.
 John O. Westwood, entomologist and archaeologist.

See also 
 Holywell Cemetery
 Osney Cemetery
 Wolvercote Cemetery

References

External links 
 Friends of St Sepulchre's Cemetery, with biographies of many people buried here
 Oxford Guide information
 Jericho Echo information
 

1848 establishments in England
Cemeteries in Oxford
Grade II listed parks and gardens in Oxfordshire
Anglican cemeteries in the United Kingdom
Christianity in Oxford